Charles George Orlando Bridgeman (13 July 1852 – 19 December 1933) was an English barrister and historian. He edited the Transactions of the Shropshire Archaeological and Historical Society.

The son of the Rev. George Thomas Orlando Bridgeman, he was educated at Harrow School and Trinity College, Cambridge. He was called to the bar in 1876. He played three first-class matches for Cambridge University Cricket Club between 1872 and 1874.

Selected works

See also
 List of Cambridge University Cricket Club players

References

External links

 

1852 births
1933 deaths
People educated at Harrow School
Alumni of Trinity College, Cambridge
English cricketers
Cambridge University cricketers
People from Wells, Somerset